Wissadula divergens is a species of plant in the family Malvaceae. It is endemic to Ecuador. Its natural habitats are subtropical or tropical dry forests and subtropical or tropical dry shrubland.

References

divergens
Endemic flora of Ecuador
Endangered plants
Taxonomy articles created by Polbot